Little Fort is a small community on the west bank of North Thompson River in the interior of British Columbia, Canada.

The community is located at the junction of Highway 5 and Highway 24 in British Columbia, Canada. The Interlakes Highway, as Highway 24 is also known, runs west to meet Highway 97 at 93 Mile House; it is also known as the Little Fort Highway. The Little Fort Ferry crosses to the east bank of the river.
A small fort was established on the East side of the river in the 1840s as a stopping point on the HBC Brigade Trail from the Cariboo to Kamloops.  Traces of the trail remain in the Eakin Creek canyon. This settlement was established by Paul Fraser in 1850 and abandoned in 1852. Before 1935, Little Fort post office was known as Mount Ollie.

References

Unincorporated settlements in British Columbia
Thompson Country
Populated places in the Thompson-Nicola Regional District